The ATP Challenger 2001 Team Padova formerly Challenger Team Città di Padova was a tennis tournament held in Padova, Italy between 2014 and 2015. In 2018, the event was reinstated replacing the International Tennis Tournament of Cortina. The event is part of the ATP Challenger Tour and is played on outdoor clay courts.

Past finals

Singles

Doubles

References

External links 
 ITF search

Padova
Clay court tennis tournaments
Tennis tournaments in Italy